Anna Lee was a British-born American actress

Anna Lee may also refer to:

 Anna Lee (violinist), Korean-American violinist
Anna Lee (TV series), a 1993 TV series
 "Anna Lee", a song by Dream Theater from their album Falling Into Infinity

See also

Anne Lee (disambiguation)